The Cleveland Night Express was an American named train of the Baltimore and Ohio Railroad (B&O) on its route between Baltimore, Maryland and Cleveland, Ohio with major station stops in Washington, D.C. and Pittsburgh, Pennsylvania.  The B&O inaugurated the Cleveland Night Express in 1915. Its  discontinuation in 1962 marked the end of B&O passenger service to Cleveland.

History
The Baltimore and Ohio Railroad was chartered in 1827 and grew to be one of the largest passenger railways in the United States, often by acquiring other, smaller railroads.  In Cleveland the B&O purchased two local companies, the Cleveland Lorain & Wheeling Railroad and the Cleveland, Terminal & Valley Railway in 1915.

From 1915 until 1962 the B&O provided overnight sleeping car service between Baltimore and Cleveland on the Cleveland Night Express.  After June 1934, the Cleveland Night Express used Cleveland's Union Terminal as its passenger station. At times in this period, the train was called the Baltimore-Washington-Cleveland Express westbound and Cleveland-Washington-Baltimore Express.

On February 7, 1956 the train had four passenger cars overturn in a sudden rockslide near McKeesport, Pennsylvania, no deaths occurred with only one injured.

Decline and end of the train
In 1962, as railroad passenger traffic was declining nationwide, the B&O discontinued the Cleveland Night Express on December 7, 1962, which ended all B&O passenger service to Ohio's largest city, Cleveland.

Stations

Schedule and equipment
In 1961, the westbound Cleveland Night Express departed Union Station (Washington, D.C.) at 9:20 p.m. daily as train # 17, arriving in Cleveland the following morning at 8:45 a.m., equipped with a Pullman sleeping car, coaches, and a lounge car having a snack bar serving what B&O described in its timetable as a "light breakfast" prior to arrival.

The westbound Cleveland Night Express train # 17 made the following principal station stops, with a connecting Budd Rail Diesel Car departing at 8:10 p.m. from Baltimore, Maryland:

References

Passenger trains of the Baltimore and Ohio Railroad
Named passenger trains of the United States
Night trains of the United States
Passenger rail transportation in Maryland
Passenger rail transportation in Ohio
Passenger rail transportation in Pennsylvania
Passenger rail transportation in West Virginia
Railway services introduced in 1915
Railway services discontinued in 1962